The 1978–79 Temple Owls men's basketball team represented Temple University as a member of the East Coast Conference during the 1978–79 NCAA Division I men's basketball season.

Roster

Schedule

|-
!colspan=12 style=| Regular season

|-
!colspan=12 style=| ECC Tournament

|-
!colspan=12 style=| NCAA Tournament

Rankings

References

Temple Owls men's basketball seasons
Temple
Temple
Temple
Temple